Toyota Center is an indoor arena located in Houston. It is named after the Japanese automobile manufacturer Toyota. The arena is home to the Houston Rockets of the National Basketball Association (NBA), and it was once the home of the Houston Aeros of the American Hockey League (AHL), and the Houston Comets of the Women's National Basketball Association (WNBA).

Rockets owner Leslie Alexander first began to request a new arena in 1995 and attempted to release the Rockets from their lease at The Summit, which ran until 2003. However, he was denied by arena owner Chuck Watson, then-owner of the Aeros, who also wanted control of a new arena. The two sides agreed to equal control over an arena in a deal signed in 1997, but the proposal was rejected by city voters in a 1999 referendum. It was not until the city and the Rockets signed an amended agreement in 2001, excluding the Aeros, that the proposal was accepted.

Construction began in July 2001, and the new arena was officially opened in October 2003. The total costs were $235 million, with the city of Houston paying the majority, and the Rockets paying for enhancements. Toyota paid US$100 million for the naming rights.

History

In May 1995, several Texas sports teams, including the Houston Rockets, proposed legislation that would dedicate state tax revenue to build new arenas. Although the bill was failed in the Texas House of Representatives, Rockets owner Leslie Alexander announced he would continue to study the possibility of constructing a new arena in downtown Houston, saying the 20-year-old Summit arena was too outdated to be profitable. Although the Summit's management said they could renovate the building for a small part of the cost of a new arena, the Rockets began talks with the city of Houston on a possible location for an arena, They also negotiated with Houston Aeros and Summit owner, Chuck Watson, to release them from their contract with the Summit, which ran until 2003.

As the negotiations continued into 1996, a panel appointed by Houston mayor Bob Lanier reported that building a new arena was "essential to keep pro sports in Houston". After Watson rejected a contract buyout proposal of $30 million, the Rockets filed a legal challenge against their lease, stating the "need to be able to buy out" of the lease. However, the city of Houston filed a counterclaim to force the Rockets to stay at the Summit, saying that if the Rockets did not honor their contract, then they might "have no incentive to honor any new agreement with the city of Houston to play in a new downtown sports arena". The validity of the lease was eventually upheld, and in April 1997, Lanier announced that the Rockets and Watson would have to agree to share control of the new arena equally, or lose access to it altogether. After both parties agreed to the terms, a bill that authorized increased taxes to pay for a new arena was signed into law in July, by then-Governor George W. Bush.

However, after the NHL decided not to consider Houston as a location for an expansion team because of the indecision over the new arena, Lanier said that he would not have a referendum in November. The Rockets began an appeal in January 1998 against the court order to stay at the Summit, but then dropped it in May, because they felt that a new arena would be ready by the time they finished their lease. In January 1999, recently elected mayor Lee Brown guaranteed a referendum on the issue before the end of the year. After several months negotiating with the Harris County-Houston Sports Authority, the Rockets finalized a deal to pay half of the constructions costs, and a referendum was set for November 2. The deal was approved by Brown and the Houston City Council, but Watson started an opposition group against the referendum, saying the arena was "not in Houston's interest". On November 3, the results of the referendum were announced, and the arena proposal was rejected by 54% of voters. Alexander said "we never thought we would lose" and that they were "devastated by the loss".

After the vote, NBA commissioner David Stern said "if there's not a new building...I think it's certain that the team will be relocated." The Houston Sports Authority had not planned to meet with the Rockets until after the  NBA season ended, but after the Rockets began to talk to other cities about relocation, they resumed talks in February 2000. Although the Rockets continued to negotiate with Louisville, Kentucky, a funding plan for the arena in Houston was released in June. A final agreement was proposed on July 6, and both the Rockets and mayor Brown agreed to the terms. After the city council approved the deal, the proposal was placed on the November referendum ballot. Leading up to the vote, the Rockets stressed that there would be "no new taxes of any kind", although opponents said the new arena would raise energy consumption, and also contended that the public would pay for too much of the costs of the arena. Contributions for the campaign for the arena included donations of US$400,000 from Reliant Energy, and a total of $590,000 in loans and contributions from Enron and Ken Lay, who the Rockets said was a "tireless" force in the campaign.  On November 8, the arena was approved by 66% of voters.

Construction

According to the agreement signed, the city of Houston bought the land for the arena and an adjoining parking garage, which was near the George R. Brown Convention Center, and paid for it by selling bonds and borrowing $30 million. Morris Architects, designed the  building, and Hunt Construction was contracted to build the arena. A building formerly owned by Houston Lighting and Power Company was demolished to make way for the arena, and two streets were closed for the duration of the construction. A groundbreaking ceremony was held on July 31, 2001, and construction continued for 26 months.

To sink the arena, $12 million was spent to excavate  of dirt over four months, which was the largest excavation in Houston history. Concrete was poured for the foundation throughout the summer of 2002, and structural work began in October. The roof was set on in December, as work continued inside, with a peak workforce of 650. In September 2003, a ribbon-cutting ceremony was held to mark the official opening of the arena. The total cost of construction was $235 million, with the city paying $182 million, and the Rockets adding $43 million for additions and enhancements.

Arena interior
The arena can seat 18,104 for a basketball game, 17,800 for ice hockey games, and 19,300 for concerts. The prices for courtside seats to a Rockets game in the new arena were raised by as much as 50% compared to prices in the team's old home, while upper-deck seat prices were lowered.

It has 103 luxury suites and 2,900 club seats (Sections 105–109, Frost Bank West Club; Sections 118–122, Frost Bank East Club).  The Rockets East & West Clubs feature upscale concessions, extra wide seats, full private bar featuring premium wine and beverage selections and concierge service. The adjacent 2,500-space Toyota Tundra garage is connected to the arena by a private skybridge that can be accessed by Suite, Court-side and Club Seat holders.

Additionally, the floor level features three separate private club lounges for access from court-side seat holders and floor seat concert goers.  Lexus Lounge and Golden Nugget Club are on the west side of the floor level and the Bogarts Platinum Lounge is located on the east side of the floor level.  All feature upscale amenities including multiple flat screen televisions, private bar, restrooms, and plush seating.  The Lexus Lounge has its own pool tables and all three court-side lounges feature numerous private court-side suites.

Toyota Center also features the Sterling Vineyards Red & White Wine Bistro, located on the lower suites level on the south side of the arena.  The restaurant features a huge dining room, private bar, two twin 1,500 bottle wine towers and views of the arena floor.

Levy Restaurants manages concession services at the arena, and offers fast food on the main concourses, while also catering a VIP restaurant for Suite and Club Seat holders. Alexander personally chose colors for the restaurant to help customers feel "warm and comfortable", and Rockets president George Postolos said that the Rockets looked "for a relationship with the people that attend events in our venue". This larger scoreboard was installed by Panasonic and made its debut during the Houston Rockets 2012–13 season opener. The arena has two additional displays located at each end of the court, and a "state-of-the-art" audio system.

Another amenity new to the Toyota Center in the 2012–2013 season is Wi-Fi.  Designed by SignalShare and implemented by OfficeConnect.net, the Wi-Fi network is deployed throughout the arena and allows high-speed internet access during events.  Its implementation was timed to be ready for the NBA All-Star Game.

Sponsorship
In July 2003, the arena was named the Toyota Center. The logo of the company was placed on the roof of the building, as well in other prominent places inside the arena, and the company was given "a dominant presence" in commercials shown during broadcasts of games played in the arena. Toyota USA has satellite offices in Houston.

Seating capacity
The seating capacity for basketball games has been as follows:

Events
The arena's first event was a Fleetwood Mac concert on October 6, 2003, and the first Rockets game at the Toyota Center was against the Denver Nuggets on October 30.

Concerts

Many concerts have also taken place in the Toyota Center, like Prince, Tool, Duran Duran on their Astronaut tour, Janet Jackson, Madonna, Tina Turner, Red Hot Chili Peppers, Gloria Estefan, Shakira, Selena Gomez, Demi Lovato, Rihanna, Miley Cyrus, Bruno Mars, Christina Aguilera, P!nk, Andrea Bocelli, Muse, High School Musical The Concert, Aerosmith, Guns N' Roses, Coldplay, RBD, Laura Pausini,  Alanis Morissette, Matchbox Twenty, Fiona Apple, Nickelback, Depeche Mode, Bon Jovi, Enrique Iglesias, Katy Perry, Drake,   Travis Scott, Cher, Britney Spears, Kanye West and Jay-Z, Justin Bieber, Taylor Swift, The Rolling Stones, One Direction, Ariana Grande, Carrie Underwood, Rammstein, Adele, Lana Del Rey, Blackpink, G-Dragon, Panic! At The Disco, Garth Brooks with Trisha Yearwood, and many more.

On July 23, 2016, Hillsong UNITED performed in the arena, the performance was recorded and released as Empires.

Other sports

In 2007, 2011, 2013, 2015, 2017, 2020, 2021, and 2022 it played host to a UFC event.

On August 21, 2010, it played host to Strikeforce: Houston.

On February 19, 2016, it played host to Bellator MMA event Bellator 149: Shamrock vs. Gracie III. The event featured a double main event featuring heavyweights Kimbo Slice vs. Dada 5000, and light heavyweights Ken Shamrock vs. Royce Gracie.  Bellator 149 had a live attendance record of 14,209 and a near $1.4 million gate at the Toyota Center, thus making Bellator 149 the largest attended show in Bellator MMA history.

The arena has hosted a number of WWE events including No Mercy 2005, Vengeance: Night of Champions, the 2009 WWE Hall of Fame ceremony, two editions of TLC: Tables, Ladders & Chairs (2010 and 2013), Night of Champions 2015, NXT TakeOver: WarGames 2017, Survivor Series 2017, Elimination Chamber 2019, as well as various episodes of Raw and SmackDown. WWE also held their first live show in front of fans, for the first since the onset of the COVID-19 pandemic, with the July 16, 2021 episode of SmackDown at the Toyota Center.

Other events
The arena hosted the 9th Annual Latin Grammy Awards on November 13, 2008.

Passion Conferences has been held in the Toyota Center since 2014. The conference draws around 20,000 people with multiple other gatherings held in Atlanta.

On September 30, 2016, the arena hosted the Kellogg's Tour of Gymnastics Champions.

Gabriel Iglesias' Netflix special "One Show Fits All" was filmed in the Toyota Center in 2019.

Attendance records
In its first year, the total attendance for events at the arena exceeded 1.5 million. The current attendance for a concert held at the arena was set on November 20, 2008, when Metallica played to a sold-out crowd of 17,962 during the Death Magnetic tour. The record for a basketball game is 18,583, set on March 26, 2010, when the Los Angeles Lakers defeated the Rockets 109–101.

Awards and recognitions
The arena was the winner of the Allen Award for Civic Enhancement by Central Houston, the "Rookie of the Year" award by the Harlem Globetrotters, and a finalist for Pollstar Magazine's "Best New Concert Venue" award.

See also
 List of sports venues with the name Toyota

References

External links

 Toyota Center Homepage

Basketball venues in Houston
Basketball venues in Texas
Gymnastics venues in Texas
Houston Aeros (1994–2013)
Houston Comets venues
Houston Rockets venues
Indoor ice hockey venues in the United States
Leadership in Energy and Environmental Design basic silver certified buildings
Mixed martial arts venues in Texas
National Basketball Association venues
Wrestling venues in Houston
Sports venues completed in 2003
Music venues in Houston
Toyota
Buildings and structures in Houston
Indoor arenas in Texas
Sports venues in Houston
Populous (company) buildings
2003 establishments in Texas
Downtown Houston